San Marino Volleyball Federation or FSPAV  is the governing body of volleyball and beach volleyball in San Marino. It was formed in 1980.

It organizes the internal league and runs the San Marino national volleyball team.

The President of the federation is Gianluigi Lazzarini.

See also
San Marino men's national volleyball team
San Marino women's national volleyball team
Banca di San Marino Serie C femminile

External links 
Sammarinese Volleyball Federation

San Marino
Volleyball